Chandausi is one of the 403 Legislative Assembly constituencies of Uttar Pradesh state in India.

It is part of Sambhal district and is reserved for candidates belonging to the Scheduled Castes.

Members of Legislative Assembly

Election results

2022

2017

See also 

 List of constituencies of the Uttar Pradesh Legislative Assembly
 Sambhal district

References

External links
 Official site of Legislature in Uttar Pradesh
 Uttar Pradesh Government website
 UP Assembly 
 

Sambhal district
Chandausi
Assembly constituencies of Uttar Pradesh